My Kind of Music was a British game show that aired on ITV from 8 February 1998 to 29 March 2002 and is hosted by Michael Barrymore.

The show's main theme, "My Kind of People", where presenter Michael Barrymore sang some of the lyrics when appearing at the very start, was based on the same song by Robert Palmer released in 1991.

Three teams of two people would test their musical knowledge against each other, and the winning team could go on to win £13,000 in the jackpot; later it was increased to £16,000 by the fourth series.

Format

Opening Song
Once the teams were introduced, one contestant (or sometimes both) from each team would then perform a song. The two remaining teams were then each asked a question related to the song, worth £50 for a correct answer. This round was not played in the first series.

Musical Knowledge
In this round, Barrymore asked a series of quickfire music questions on the buzzer, each worth £50. An incorrect answer would freeze a team out of the rest of the question. On some occasions, if none of the teams knew the answer to a question, Barrymore would offer £50 to a member of the audience if they answered it correctly.

Pick The Picture
Nine pictures of various celebrities would appear on a video wall. A song was then played and the contestants had to guess which picture connected the song that was being played. In the first series, this was played as the opening round with £50 for every correct answer and in series two, it was moved to the fourth round of the game with correct answers now worth £150.

Pop Props
From Series 3 onwards, Pick The Picture was replaced with Pop Props. On each turn, Barrymore would collect some items hidden behind a jukebox and then show them to the contestants. These were visual clues represented to a well-known song. Correct answers were worth £100.

My Kind Of People
Contestants were shown a film of Barrymore inviting members of the public to sing in front of an audience at an outside location, usually a large shopping centre. After the film, Barrymore asked a series of questions to test the contestants memory and observation on what they saw. In the first two series, this was the third round of the game and correct answers worth £100. When Pop Props was introduced in series three, this became the fourth round and the money increased to £150 for each correct answer.

Sing The Song
Contestants on each team took it in turns to sing a famous song of a well known artist. Their team-mate stands behind the video wall and has to guess which artist they are singing. Each correct answer was worth £150 and both pairs of contestants changed places after each song. Each team were only allowed to pass up to three times, and their turn would end once they had run out of passes. At the end of this round, the lowest scoring team was eliminated, leaving with whatever money they had earned.

Musical interlude
Following Sing The Song, a brief interlude in the game took place with a performance from a special guest.

In the first series, Barrymore would sing a popular song such as Backstreet Boys' "Backstreet's Back", P Diddy's "I'll Be Missing You" etc. In the second series, this was changed to an unsigned musical act, who Barrymore would introduce as "someone he met whilst filming", and would often join in with the performance. From the third series onwards, a well-known pop singer or band would perform their new single in this slot.

Megamix
The two remaining teams each picked a year of their own personal choice and were shown clips of six songs from that particular year. They would earn £100 per song if they identified it correctly and an extra £100 if they could also name the exact artist correctly. After this round, the runner-up team left the game with the money they had won.

Musical Families
The last team standing faced the final jackpot round Musical Families. Four well known singers had been formed into a pretend family of a dad, mum, son and daughter. The contestants stopped a randomiser to select one of the blank pictures by using a plunger buzzer, and then Barrymore would begin to read a series of clues related to the singer they had to guess. The pair had 60 seconds to correctly guess all four singers and the clock would stop once they either answered correctly or passed, in which case they could have another go at it at the end if there was any time left.

Each correct answer won £1,000 and identifying all four singers correctly won the jackpot of an additional £10,000 for the first three series, increased to £13,000 from series four. Whatever they won in this round was added to the money they had won in earlier rounds, meaning that winning teams would often walk away with prize money in excess of around £15,000–£20,000.

Famous contestants
The show was noticeable for some future music stars appearing as contestants on the show, including Paul Potts, who later won the first series of Britain's Got Talent in 2007, Jodie Prenger, who won I'd Do Anything in 2008, and Jessica Taylor, who went on to become part of the band Liberty X that was formed from the original series of Popstars. Another original Popstars contestant, Danny Foster, made an appearance on one episode during a 'My Kind Of People' segment.

Transmissions

†12 episodes had been recorded as part of Series 5, but only five episodes were shown before ITV pulled the programme from its schedules.

External links

1990s British music television series
2000s British music television series
1990s British game shows
2000s British game shows
1998 British television series debuts
2002 British television series endings
English-language television shows
ITV game shows
London Weekend Television shows
Musical game shows
Michael Barrymore
Television series by ITV Studios